Nicholas James Daukas (December 11, 1922 – February 25, 2003) was an American football tackle.

Daukas was born in Nashua, New Hampshire, in 1922 and attended Cushing High School. He played college football at Dartmouth. He served in the Army during World War II and in the Korean War after receiving his degree from Dartmouth.

He was drafted by the Philadelphia Eagles in the 28th round of the 1944 NFL Draft but never played for the Eagles. He played in the All-America Football Conference for the Brooklyn Dodgers in 1946 and 1947. He appeared in a total of 15 professional football games, two of them as a starter.  His older brother Lou Daukas also played for the Dodgers in 1947.

Daukas later became a medical doctor and assistant professor at Yale Medical School. He lived in Middletown, Connecticut, from 1956 until his death. He died in 2003 in Middletown.

References

1922 births
2003 deaths
American football tackles
Brooklyn Dodgers (AAFC) players
Dartmouth Big Green football players
Players of American football from New Hampshire
Yale University faculty
United States Army personnel of World War II
United States Army personnel of the Korean War